The American College of Greece (ACG) is a private college and high school in Agia Paraskevi, Greece. It was founded by United Church of Christ American missionaries in 1875. It was originally a primary and secondary school for girls. As of 2020, it has 5,774 students enrolled in all three of its divisions.

Structure
The college is run by the namesake 501(c)(3) not-for-profit organization based in Boston, Massachusetts, United States.

Dr. John S. Bailey served as president from 1975 to 2008.
Dr. David G. Horner has been the president since 2008. The college is governed by a Board of Trustees.

The college has three divisions:
 Pierce College, for primary and secondary education.
 Deree College, for undergraduate and postgraduate
 Alba Graduate Business School

High school 
The American College of Greece was founded in Smyrna (currently Izmir, Turkey), in Ottoman Empire in 1875 as a school for girls. It was relocated to Hellenikon, Athens, after the loss of Asia minor to the Turks at the invitation of then Prime Minister of Greece Eleftherios Venizelos. During the Axis occupation of Greece, its premises were used as a hospital under German command. After the war, the college reopened at Hellenikon, where it remained until it moved to its new campus in the Athens suburb of Agia Paraskevi, where it operates to this day.

Pierce won the British Council International School Award for the academic years 2015-2018 bestowed by the British Council in Greece and is a member of the International Schools Theater Association.

As of January 2016, Pierce is an authorized IB World School and has been offering IB Diploma Programme since September 2016.

The College 
The American College of Greece awarded its first baccalaureate degrees in 1969. In 1973, its undergraduate division was renamed Deree in honor of Greek-born benefactor from Chicago, William S. Deree (born Derehanis). In 2004, it offered its first graduate programs.

Deree is accredited by the New England Commission of Higher Education (NECHE) in the US and validated by the Open University in the UK. The campus is located in Aghia Paraskevi, Athens, with four schools:  Business & Economics; Liberal Arts and Sciences; Frances Rich School of Fine and Performing Arts; and the Graduate School of Arts & Sciences that offers Master's degrees in applied psychology, communication, and leadership.

Graduate Business School 
In 2012 the American College of Greece's Degree division formed an alliance with Alba Graduate Business School, a nonprofit institution funded by student tuition and fees that offers MBA programs in shipping, financial services and banking."

The two institutions are distinct legal entities with integrated governance and organizational structures. Under this arrangement, Alba is also accredited by NEASC under Degree-ACG's accreditation.

Notable alumni
 Katia Dandoulaki, Actress
 Notis Mitarakis, Politician
 Mimi Denissi, Greek actress
 Panos Karan, Greek pianist
 Vassilis Kontozamanis, Politician
 Celia Kritharioti, Fashion Designer
 Elena Panaritis, Greek economist
 Chrysanthos Panas, Greek businessperson
 Miranda Xafa, Greek economist
 Sophia Zarabouka, Writer & Illustrator
 Fariha Al-Ahmad, Sheikha of Kuwait

References

External links
 Official website

Private education in Greece
Education in Athens
Educational institutions established in 1875
1875 establishments in the Ottoman Empire
Universities and colleges in Attica